Ronald Carlton Mauge (born 10 March 1969) is an English-born Trinidad and Tobago former professional footballer, who played for Fulham, Bury, Manchester City, Plymouth Argyle, and Bristol Rovers. He also won caps for the Trinidad and Tobago national team, the homeland of Mauge's parents.

Biography
Born in Islington, Mauge started his career as a trainee at Charlton Athletic, before moving on to Fulham on a free transfer. Two years later he was bought by Bury for £40,000. In 1991, he spent a brief spell as a loan player at Manchester City, where he made ten appearances. In 1995 Plymouth bought him for £40,000, with Mauge becoming the first Argyle player to score at Wembley as Plymouth defeated Darlington 1–0 in the Third Division play-off final in 1996.

He signed for Bristol Rovers on a free transfer in 1999. In 2000, he was called up to the Trinidad and Tobago squad, which he qualified for through his parents. He played in the Gold Cup, but broke his leg in a first round match against Mexico. Mauge retired from professional football in 2002.

He was later player/manager of non-League side Whitton United, and worked as a Football Development Officer for Ipswich Borough Council.

References

1969 births
Footballers from Islington (district)
Charlton Athletic F.C. players
Fulham F.C. players
Manchester City F.C. players
Bury F.C. players
Plymouth Argyle F.C. players
Bristol Rovers F.C. players
Whitton United F.C. players
Citizens of Trinidad and Tobago through descent
Trinidad and Tobago footballers
Trinidad and Tobago international footballers
English sportspeople of Trinidad and Tobago descent
Living people
2000 CONCACAF Gold Cup players
Whitton United F.C. managers
Association football midfielders
English football managers